Governor Kelly may refer to:

Harry Kelly (politician) (1898–1971), 39th Governor of Michigan
John Kelly (diplomat) (born 1941), Governor of the Turks and Caicos Islands from 1996 to 2000
Laura Kelly (born 1950), 48th Governor of Kansas